Nont Muangngam (born 20 April 1997), simply known as Nont, is a Thai-French professional footballer who plays as a goalkeeper for Thai League 1 club Lamphun Warriors.

International career
In August 2017, he won the Football at the 2017 Southeast Asian Games with Thailand U23.

Honours

Club
Chiangrai United
 Thai FA Cup: 2017

International
Thailand U-23
 Sea Games  Gold Medal; 2017

References

External links
 

1997 births
Living people
Nont Muangngam
Nont Muangngam
French footballers
Association football goalkeepers
Nont Muangngam
Nont Muangngam
Nont Muangngam
Nont Muangngam
Nont Muangngam
Nont Muangngam
France youth international footballers
Nont Muangngam
Nont Muangngam
Southeast Asian Games medalists in football
Footballers at the 2018 Asian Games
Competitors at the 2017 Southeast Asian Games
Nont Muangngam
Competitors at the 2019 Southeast Asian Games
Thai expatriate sportspeople in France